Portage River may refer to:

Canada
Portage River (Alberta), a tributary of the Peace River
Portage River (Beauce-Sartigan), a river in Quebec
Portage River (Bécancour River tributary), a river in Quebec
Portage River (Boucher River tributary), a river in Quebec
Portage River (La Sarre River tributary), a river in Quebec
Portage River (New Brunswick), a tributary of the Northwest Miramichi River
Portage River (Percé), a river in Quebec
Portage River (Petit-Saguenay River tributary), a tributary of the Northwest Miramichi River
Portage River, a river of Prince Edward Island

United States

Michigan
Portage River (Houghton County, Michigan), the southern end of the Keweenaw Waterway
Portage River (Jackson County, Michigan), a tributary of the Grand River
Portage River (Kalamazoo/St. Joseph Counties), a tributary of the St. Joseph River
Portage River (Livingston/Washtenaw counties), a tributary of the Huron River

Minnesota

Portage River (Fish Hook River tributary), Minnesota

Portage River (Moose Horn River tributary), Minnesota
Portage River (Nina Moose River tributary), Minnesota

Ohio
Portage River (Ohio), empties into Lake Erie near Port Clinton, Ohio

Historical uses
The South Branch of the Chicago River, once called the Portage River